This article describes the group stage of the 2017–18 LEN Champions League.

Format
16 teams were drawn into two groups of eight teams. Teams play against each other home-and-away in a round-robin format.

Group A

All times are local

Matchday 1

Partizan vs. Orvosegyetem SC

Dynamo Moscow vs. Jug CO

CNA Barceloneta vs. Olympiacos

Waspo 98 Hannover vs. AN Brescia

Matchday 2

Jug CO vs. Partizan

Olympiacos vs. Dynamo Moscow

Orvosegyetem SC vs. Waspo 98 Hannover

AN Brescia vs. CNA Barceloneta

Matchday 3

Waspo 98 Hannover vs. Jug CO

Partizan vs. Dynamo Moscow

CNA Barceloneta vs. Orvosegyetem SC

AN Brescia vs. Olympiacos

Matchday 4

Olympiacos vs. Partizan

Dynamo Moscow vs. Waspo 98 Hannover

Jug CO vs. CNA Barceloneta

Orvosegyetem SC vs. AN Brescia

Matchday 5

Waspo 98 Hannover vs. Partizan

Orvosegyetem SC vs. Olympiacos

CNA Barceloneta vs. Dynamo Moscow

AN Brescia vs. Jug CO

Matchday 6

Dynamo Moscow vs. AN Brescia

Jug CO vs. Orvosegyetem SC

Partizan vs. CNA Barceloneta

Olympiacos vs. Waspo 98 Hannover

Matchday 7

Olympiacos vs. Jug CO

Orvosegyetem SC vs. Dynamo Moscow

AN Brescia vs. Partizan

CNA Barceloneta vs. Waspo 98 Hannover

Matchday 8

Dynamo Moscow vs. Orvosegyetem SC

Waspo 98 Hannover vs. CNA Barceloneta

Partizan vs. AN Brescia

Jug CO vs. Olympiacos

Matchday 9

Waspo 98 Hannover vs. Olympiacos

CNA Barceloneta vs. Partizan

AN Brescia vs. Dynamo Moscow

Orvosegyetem SC vs. Jug CO

Matchday 10

Olympiacos vs. Orvosegyetem SC

Dynamo Moscow vs. CNA Barceloneta

Partizan vs. Waspo 98 Hannover

Jug CO vs. AN Brescia

Matchday 11

CNA Barceloneta vs. Jug CO

Partizan vs. Olympiacos

Waspo 98 Hannover vs. Dynamo Moscow

AN Brescia vs. Orvosegyetem SC

Matchday 12

Dynamo Moscow vs. Partizan

Olympiacos vs. AN Brescia

Orvosegyetem SC vs. CNA Barceloneta

Jug CO vs. Waspo 98 Hannover

Matchday 13

CNA Barceloneta vs. AN Brescia

Dynamo Moscow vs. Olympiacos

Partizan vs. Jug CO

Waspo 98 Hannover vs. Orvosegyetem SC

Matchday 14

Olympiacos vs. CNA Barceloneta

Orvosegyetem SC vs. Partizan

AN Brescia vs. Waspo 98 Hannover

Jug CO vs. Dynamo Moscow

Group B

All times are local

Matchday 1

CN Sabadell vs. Szolnoki VSC

Steaua București vs. ZF Eger

Jadran Carine vs. Spandau 04

Pro Recco vs. AZC Alphen

Matchday 2

ZF Eger vs. Pro Recco

Szolnoki VSC vs. Steaua București

Spandau 04 vs. CN Sabadell

AZC Alphen vs. Jadran Carine

Matchday 3

CN Sabadell vs. AZC Alphen

Jadran Carine vs. ZF Eger

Spandau 04 vs. Szolnoki VSC

Pro Recco vs. Steaua București

Matchday 4

Steaua București vs. Jadran Carine

ZF Eger vs. CN Sabadell

Szolnoki VSC vs. Pro Recco

AZC Alphen vs. Spandau 04

Matchday 5

CN Sabadell vs. Steaua București

Jadran Carine vs. Pro Recco

Spandau 04 vs. ZF Eger

AZC Alphen vs. Szolnoki VSC

Matchday 6

Jadran Carine vs. Szolnoki VSC

ZF Eger vs. AZC Alphen

Steaua București vs. Spandau 04

Pro Recco vs. CN Sabadell

Matchday 7

CN Sabadell vs. Jadran Carine

Szolnoki VSC vs. ZF Eger

Spandau 04 vs. Pro Recco

AZC Alphen vs. Steaua București

Matchday 8

Jadran Carine vs. CN Sabadell

ZF Eger vs. Szolnoki VSC

Steaua București vs. AZC Alphen

Pro Recco vs. Spandau 04

Matchday 9

CN Sabadell vs. Pro Recco

Szolnoki VSC vs. Jadran Carine

Spandau 04 vs. Steaua București

AZC Alphen vs. ZF Eger

Matchday 10

Steaua București vs. CN Sabadell

Szolnoki VSC vs. AZC Alphen

ZF Eger vs. Spandau 04

Pro Recco vs. Jadran Carine

Matchday 11

Jadran Carine vs. Steaua București

Spandau 04 vs. AZC Alphen

Pro Recco vs. Szolnoki VSC

CN Sabadell vs. ZF Eger

Matchday 12

Szolnoki VSC vs. Spandau 04

Steaua București vs. Pro Recco

ZF Eger vs. Jadran Carine

AZC Alphen vs. CN Sabadell

Matchday 13

Steaua București vs. Szolnoki VSC

Jadran Carine vs. AZC Alphen

Pro Recco vs. ZF Eger

CN Sabadell vs. Spandau 04

Matchday 14

ZF Eger vs. Steaua București

Szolnoki VSC vs. CN Sabadell

Spandau 04 vs. Jadran Carine

AZC Alphen vs. Pro Recco

External links

2017–18 LEN Champions League